Alban Landry (October 17, 1934 – August 4, 2013) was a politician in the province of New Brunswick, Canada. He was elected to the Legislative Assembly of New Brunswick in 1995 and defeated for re-election by Joel Bernard in 1999.

He represented the electoral district of Nepisiguit.

References 

1934 births
2013 deaths
New Brunswick Liberal Association MLAs
20th-century Canadian politicians
People from Bathurst, New Brunswick